"Don't Download This Song" is the first single from "Weird Al" Yankovic's 12th studio album Straight Outta Lynwood. The song was released exclusively on August 21, 2006 as a digital download. It is a style parody of "We Are the World", "Voices That Care", "Hands Across America", "Heal the World" and other similar charity songs. The song "describes the perils of online music file-sharing" in a tongue-in-cheek manner. To further the sarcasm, the song was freely available for streaming and to legally download in DRM-free MPEG fileformat at Weird Al's Myspace page, a standalone website, as well as his YouTube channel.

Background

"Don't Download This Song" references several court cases related to the RIAA and copyright infringement of music. Among these are lawsuits against "a grandma" (presumably Gertrude Walton, who was sued for copyright infringement six months after dying) and a "7-year-old girl" (presumably a reference to Tanya Andersen's daughter sued at age 10 for alleged copyright infringements made at the age of 7), as well as Lars Ulrich's strong stance against copyright infringement of music in the days of Napster. The song also challenges the RIAA's claim that file sharing prevents the artists from profiting from their work, as the song argues that they are still very financially successful via their recording contracts: ("Don't take away money from artists just like me/How else can I afford another solid-gold Humvee, And diamond-studded swimming pools? These things don't grow on trees"). Mention is also made of Tommy Chong's time spent in prison.

Yankovic's own views on filesharing are less clear-cut:

Yankovic's intention was to leave the listener with no clear understanding of Yankovic's own views on the matter, "all by design".

Music video

The music video, animated by Bill Plympton, premiered August 22, 2006 on Yahoo! Music. It depicts the vision of the capture, trial, imprisonment, attempted execution, escape, and burning of a young boy who burns a CD on his computer.  The boy's death, where he stands on top of a tower just before it explodes, parodies the film White Heat, where Cody Jarrett, played by James Cagney, dies in a similar fashion. Various people, from policemen to criminals to even sharks and dogs, are then seen celebrating throughout the ending chorus. But at the end, it turns out the boy is just imagining what would happen if he downloaded the song, so he throws away the burned CD and goes back to playing his guitar. Throughout the song, the video coloring   gradually changes from color to grayscale to dark grayscale to yellowed.

On MTV's MTV Music site where this music video is available, they have censored the names of the file sharing programs in the song, such as LimeWire or KaZaA. Weird Al explained that MTV contacted him and told him they would not air his video if the references to the filesharing programs were not in some way removed, so he "made the creative decision to bleep them out as obnoxiously as possible, so that there would be no mistake I was being censored."

The video was praised by the Annie Awards and was subsequently nominated for Best Animated Short Subject for its 34th ceremony, but was beat out by the Ice Age featurette, No Time for Nuts.

See also

 List of singles by "Weird Al" Yankovic
 List of songs by "Weird Al" Yankovic

References

External links
 alyankovicVEVO, "Weird Al Yankovic - Don't Download This Song", YouTube, October 2, 2009. The music video at Yankovic's official YouTube Vevo website.
 Plymptoons, DON'T DOWNLOAD THIS SONG - Weird Al Yankovic & Bill Plympton, YouTube. The music video at Bill Plympton's official YouTube website.
 Listen to the Song and Send E-Cards

2006 singles
Protest songs
"Weird Al" Yankovic songs
Songs written by "Weird Al" Yankovic
Pop ballads
Music videos directed by Bill Plympton
Mass media about Internet culture
2006 songs
2000s ballads
Animated music videos
Volcano Entertainment singles